The 2017 Aegon Championships, also known traditionally as the Queen's Club Championships, was a men's tennis tournament played on outdoor grass courts. It was the 115th edition of those championships and part of the ATP World Tour 500 series of the 2017 ATP World Tour. It took place at the Queen's Club in London, United Kingdom from 19 June until 25 June 2017. Unseeded Feliciano López won the singles title.

Points and prize money

Point distribution

Prize money 

*per team

Singles main draw entrants

Seeds

 Rankings are as of June 12, 2017.

Other entrants
The following players received wildcards into the singles main draw:
  Thanasi Kokkinakis
  Cameron Norrie
  James Ward

The following players received entry from the qualifying draw:
  Julien Benneteau 
  Jérémy Chardy
  Stefan Kozlov 
  Denis Shapovalov

The following players received entry as lucky losers:
  Liam Broady
  Pierre-Hugues Herbert
  Jordan Thompson

Withdrawals
Before the tournament
  Juan Martín del Potro →replaced by  Nikoloz Basilashvili
  David Goffin →replaced by  Adrian Mannarino
  Rafael Nadal →replaced by  Jordan Thompson
  Diego Schwartzman →replaced by  Kyle Edmund
  Jack Sock →replaced by  Liam Broady

Retirements
  Nick Kyrgios

Doubles main draw entrants

Seeds

 Rankings are as of June 12, 2017.

Other entrants
The following pairs received wildcards into the doubles main draw:
  Kyle Edmund /  Thanasi Kokkinakis
  Dominic Inglot /  Nick Kyrgios

The following pair received entry from the qualifying draw:
  Marcus Daniell /  Marcelo Demoliner

The following pair received entry as lucky losers:
  Nicholas Monroe /  Donald Young

Withdrawals
Before the tournament
  Nick Kyrgios

Retirements
  Pierre-Hugues Herbert

Finals

Singles

  Feliciano López defeated  Marin Čilić, 4–6, 7–6(7–2), 7–6(10–8)

Doubles

  Jamie Murray /  Bruno Soares defeated  Julien Benneteau /  Édouard Roger-Vasselin, 6–2, 6–3

References

External links
 Official website
 ATP World Tour website